Disagree may refer to:
 Disagreement, failure to agree.
 Disagree (band) is a Malaysian rock band.